Kibble Park is an urban park in Gosford City, on the Central Coast of New South Wales, Australia. The park is a common location for public events in Gosford City.

History 

City officials announced construction plans for a library, fountain, and plaza on 11 November 1979.  Construction on the fountain was completed in November 1989. It officially opened on 21 November 1989.

Description 

The park is centrally located in the Gosford City central business district. The west area of the park has seating, a stage, a sheltered area and fountain, The east area features a collection of trees and a garden bed. The Gosford City Library is located on the southern edge of the park.

Events in the park 

Kibble Park hosts annual public events, such as the Mad Hatters Tea Party and Midday Monster Mash. The park also hosts event for public holidays, such as Australia Day and Harmony Day. On Christmas Eve and Christmas Day, Christmas carolers hold an annual caroling sing-along event in Kibble Park.

Development Project 
On 31 August 2015, Lederer Group announced a $650 million development project to improve Gosford's central business district. Lederer Group plans to upgrade Kibble Park as part of the project.

References 

Parks in New South Wales